Sweet Cobra is an American post-hardcore band from Chicago, Illinois, United States.

Members
 Timothy Botchy Remis – bass and vocals
 Robert Arthur Lanham Jr. – guitar
 Jason Gagovski – drums and cymbals

Selected discography

Studio albums
Praise (Seventh Rule Recordings, 2003)
Forever (Hawthorne Street Records, 2007)
Mercy (Black Market Activities, 2010)
Earth (Magic Bullet Records, 2015)
Threes (Hawthorne Street Records, 2022)

Splits
 Doomriders & Sweet Cobra: Are We Not Men? 7" (split with Doomriders) (2012, Hawthorne Street Records)
 Sweet Cobra / Get Rad 7" (split with Get Rad) (2014, Hawthorne Street, Lifeline, Underground Communique)
 Young Widows & Sweet Cobra Live at Three Floyds Brewing 12" (split with Young Widows) (2018, Hawthorne Street Records)

EPs
Bottom Feeder (Seventh Rule Recordings, 2009)

Music videos
 "Future Ghosts" (2015)
 "Repo" (2016)

External links
 Sweet Cobra at Facebook

Hardcore punk groups from Illinois